"Meet You There" is a song by English pop punk band Busted. It was written by James Bourne and Charlie Simpson and was originally recorded for, and included on, their second studio album A Present for Everyone (2003). It was a fan favourite, despite not being an official single.

In 2015, ten years after disbanding in 2005, Busted re-recorded the song at Abbey Road Studios, their first new recording in 12 years, and released a music video for it. The re-recorded version appeared as a bonus track on Japanese editions of the group's third album Night Driver (2016).

References

2003 songs
2015 songs
Busted (band) songs
Songs written by James Bourne
Songs written by Tom Fletcher